Kelapa may refer to the following places:

Kelapa Dua, district in the Tangerang Regency of Banten in Java, Indonesia
Kelapa Gading, subdistrict of North Jakarta, Jakarta, Indonesia
Kelapa Sawit, town in Kulai District, Johor, Malaysia